A red star is an important ideological and religious symbol.

Red Star may also refer to:

Astronomy
 Red dwarf, a small and relatively cool star
 Red giant, a large, cool non-main sequence star

Books
 Krasnaya Zvezda, or Red Star, a Soviet and Russian military newspaper
 Red Star (publication), a 1970–1971 series of American communist publications 
 Red Star (novel), a 1908 novel by Alexander Bogdanov
 The Red Star, a comic book series by Christian Gossett 
 The Red Star (video game), a video game based on that graphic novel
 Red Star (comics), a character in the DC universe 
 Red Star (G.I. Joe), a character in the G.I. Joe universe
 Red Star, a fictional planet in the Dragonriders of Pern universe
 Red Star, a planet-like star in the Bionicle line of toys

Sport
 Sport Society Red Star (Serbian: Sportsko društvo Crvena Zvezda), a sports association in Belgrade, Serbia
 Red Star Belgrade (Serbian: Crvena Zvezda Beograd), a football club which is a member of this association
 Red Star F.C., a football club in Paris, France
 Red Star FC, a football club in Anse-aux-Pins, Seychelles
 FC Red Star Zürich, a football club in Zürich, Switzerland
 Seaham Red Star F.C., a football club in Seaham, England
 Rudá Hvězda Brno, a football club from Brno, Czech Republic
 Rudá Hvězda Znojmo, former name of a football club 1. SC Znojmo from Czech Republic
 Rudá Hvězda Cheb, a former name of a football club FK Hvězda Cheb from Czech Republic
 Rudá Hvězda Bratislavax, a former name of  the football club FK Inter Bratislava from Slovakia
 FK Crvena Zvezda Gnjilane, a former name of a football club KF Drita from Gnjilane, Kosovo
 Cherveno Zname, a former name of the football club  PFC CSKA Sofia from  Bulgaria
 Estrella Roja FC, a football club from Caracas, Venezuela
 Estrela Vermelha do Huambo, a football club from Huambo, Angola
 Estrela Vermelha (Beira), a football club from Beira, Mozambique
 Russian Red Stars or MHL Red Stars, an ice hockey team formed with players of the Russian Junior Hockey League
 Chicago Red Stars, a football club in Chicago, United States
 HC Kunlun Red Star, an ice hockey club in Beijing, China

Music
 Bravado Cartel, formerly RedStar, an English rock band
 Red Star (album), an album by Noah Howard
 Red Star (EP), an EP by Third Eye Blind
 "Red Stars", a song by the Birthday Massacre from Walking with Strangers

Places
Red Star, Kentucky
 Red Star, a station on the Pyongyang Metro

Brands
 Red Star, an unrecognized humanitarian protection emblem proposed by Zimbabwe
 Red Star Line, a former passenger ocean line between Antwerp and New York City
 Redstar Morning Glory, the plant Ipomoea coccinea
 Red Star Parcels, a former parcels service in the UK
 Red Star poultry, another name for the Red Sex Link breed of poultry
 Red Star Yeast, a brand of yeast produced in Milwaukee, Wisconsin
 Red Star OS, a North Korean Linux distribution

See also
Krasnaya Zvezda (disambiguation)
 :ru:Красная звезда (значения) (disambiguation) on Russian Wikipedia
 Star Red, a Japanese manga series